Great Divide is the debut studio album by American rock band Semisonic.  It was released April 9, 1996, by MCA Records.  It was produced by Paul Fox, and was recorded and mixed by Ed Thacker.

History
Semisonic had signed a record contract with Elektra Records to record the Great Divide album.  During recording, Bob Krasnow, the president of Elektra Records had quit, and in the changeover to a new president, the label dropped Semisonic.  The band then signed with MCA Records, and finished recording the album. "F.N.T." was featured in the 1999 film 10 Things I Hate About You.

Track listing
All tracks written by Dan Wilson unless otherwise noted.

Personnel

Semisonic
John Munson – bass guitar, backing vocals, lead vocals 
Jacob Slichter – drums, keyboards, backing vocals
Dan Wilson – lead vocals, guitars

Technical personnel
Paul Fox – production, organ , bass guitar , orchestral arrangement

References

1996 albums
Semisonic albums
Albums produced by Paul Fox (record producer)
MCA Records albums
Indie rock albums by American artists